Traveler IQ Challenge was a free geography game made by Canadian studio Travelpod.

Development

The Wall Street Journal explained the game was "created as a marketing gimmick in June by TravelPod, a travel Web site owned by Expedia". It noted Traveler IQ Challenge fit into the growing category of casual games, and contextually came at a time when there was a "renewed interest in geography, stimulated by new technologies like GPS satellite-based navigation devices and Google Earth".

Luc Levesque, a Canadian programmer, traveler and founder of TravelPod, was inspired by a game he played on long train trips where he "would randomly name a country and one of his travel companions would attempt to name another country or capital city that starts with the third letter of the previous country's name". After Facebook opened up its site so independent developers could create games for the social networking site, "Two programmers created the game for TravelPod in just under three weeks".

In 2007, Traveler IQ had "more than four million people a month who play it on sites across the Internet, including Facebook's popular social network". As a result of the game, Travelpod saw "huge increases in registrations and traffic". By 2013, the game had "netted 7800 links from almost 1000 root domains".

Gameplay
The Wall Street Journal described the gameplay: "Traveler IQ starts out asking users to locate some of the better known cities and attractions in the world, like London, giving users a limit of about 10 seconds to pinpoint them on a map. The locations quickly get harder with cities like Ashkabat, Turkmenistan. The game tells users how close, in kilometers, they got to the actual locations and scores them accordingly, with more points awarded for shorter distances".

Critical reception
Geographer at the University of Kansas, Jerome Dobson, despite not having played the game, said "new technological applications like Traveler IQ are helping to revive geography after a decades-long decline in the teaching the subject in U.S. schools". TeachersFirst said "This challenging geography website is sure to excite your students as they click their way throughout the world", and noted its classroom potential. Facebook Applications gave the game 3.5/5, "because it's fun challenging, and educative as well".

References

2006 video games
Browser games
Multiplayer online games
Quiz video games
Video games developed in Canada